Ferdinand (Music from the Motion Picture) is the soundtrack extended play that accompanied the 2017 film of the same name, released by Island Records on December 1, 2017. The album featured three original songs, with two of them being released as singles: "Home" and "Watch Me" performed by Nick Jonas. The score album, composed by John Powell, was released as Ferdinand (Original Motion Picture Score) by Fox Music on December 15, 2017.

Ferdinand (Music from the Motion Picture)

Singles 
On September 19, 2017, it was announced that singer Nick Jonas wrote and recorded a song called "Home" for the film. It was featured in the third trailer released the next day and also appears in the film and end credits. It was released as the first promotional single of the soundtrack on October 20, 2017. A second song by Jonas, "Watch Me", was used for the dance battle between the bulls and the horses, and was released alongside the film's EP on December 1.

Track listing
The soundtrack features three original tracks: "Home" and "Watch Me" by Nick Jonas, and "Lay Your Head On Me" by Juanes. Additionally, "I Know You Want Me (Calle Ocho)" by Pitbull, were featured in the film, but not on the soundtrack.

Reception 
Euan Franklin of The Upcoming wrote "John Powell’s soundtrack is full of pleasant strumming from Spanish guitars, but is intruded upon by the poppy hindrance of Joe Jonas. His songs (specially written for Ferdinand) are tied to the animation’s dance and action sequences, making the scenes more like music videos or even parodies. His involvement feels shoehorned into the movie and appears to be a greedy attempt at publicity, encouraging people to purchase the soundtrack." Michael Rechtshaffen of The Hollywood Reporter "a golden opportunity seems to have been missed with the soundtrack, where, of the three original songs, two are performed by Nick Jonas, reserving the third for Juanes. In a year when Luis Fonsi and Daddy Yankee’s “Despacito” smashed chart records the world over, it might have been a better plan to hear how Ferdinand and company would do it down in Madrid or Toledo."

Accolades

Ferdinand (Original Motion Picture Score) 

John Powell, who scored for most of Blue Sky Studios' ventures, composed the score for Ferdinand, becoming his last collaboration with the company, after its closure on April 10, 2021. The score album was digitally released by Fox Music on December 15, 2017 and physically distributed by La-La-Land Records on December 22, 2017.

Track listing

Reception 
James Southall of Movie Wave wrote "Ferdinand is such a fun score" and further added "It’s a little more laid-back than most of the composer’s animated scores but still so energetic and full of life, the hour-long album passes by in no time – and the inherent flair which comes from the Spanish touches is just delightful." Filmtracks.com wrote "In the end, though, the competent ethnic applications and outstanding recording quality cannot really compensate for a rather underwhelming musical narrative sans strong themes. A charming score-only album passes without worry and doesn't have the obnoxious interludes of the Rio scores. Casual listeners should explore the track "From Train Station to Arena" before all others. The whole will undoubtedly entertain, but this is not Powell at his most memorable in the genre."

Credits 
Credits adapted from CD liner notes.

 Composer – John Powell
 Producer – Batu Sener, John Powell, Dan Goldwasser, MV Gerhard
 Additional music and arrangements – Anthony Willis, Batu Sener, Paul Mounsey
 Engineer – John Traunwieser, John Crooks
 Recording – Shawn Murphy, Milton Gutierrez, Erik Swanson
 Mixing – Shawn Murphy, John Traunwieser
 Mastering – Patricia Sullivan
 Music editor – Tom Carlson
 Score editor – David Channing
 Production assistance – Frank K. DeWald, Neil S. Bulk, Soya Soo
 Copyist – Gregory Jamrok, JoAnn Kane Music Service, Mark Graham
 Instruments
 Accordion – Nick Ariondo
 Bassoon – Anthony Parnther, Damian Montano, Ken Munday, Rose Corrigan, William May
 Cello – Alisha Bauer, Armen Ksajikian, Cecilia Tsan, Charlie Tyler, Dennis Karmazyn, Eric Byers, Giovanna Clayton, Jacob Braun, Joon Sung Jun, Julie Jung, László Mezö, Ross Gasworth, Steve Erdody, Tim Landauer, Tim Loo, Trevor Handy, Vanessa Freebairn Smith, Helen Altenbach
 Contrabass – Christian Kollgaard, Drew Dembowski, Ed Meares, Geoff Osika, Ian Walker, Mike Valerio, Oscar Hidalgo
 Clarinet – Dan Higgins, Ralph Williams, Stuart Clark
 Drums – Satnam Ramgotra
 Electric bass – Brandon Gilliard
 Flute – Ben Smolen, Heather Clark, Jenni Olson, Steve Kujala
 French horn – Allen Fogle, Amy Jo Rhine, Andrew Bain, Dan Kelley, Dave Everson, Dylan Hart, Greg Roosa, Jenny Kim, John Mason, Katelyn Faraudo, Laura Brenes, Mark Adams, Mike McCoy, Sarah Bach, Steve Becknell
 Guitar – Adam Del Monte, George Doering, Michael "Nomad" Ripoll*, Ramon Stagnaro
 Harp – Katie Kirkpatrick, Marcia Dickstein
 Oboe – Jessica Pearlman, Lara Wickes, Leslie Reed, Rong Huey Liu
 Percussion – Brian Kilgore, Alan Estes, Bob Zimmitti, Brian Kilgore, Dan Greco, Ted Atkatz, Ken McGrath, Pete Korpela, Wade Culbreath
 Piano, celesta – Randy Kerber
 Timpani – Don Williams, Greg Goodall
 Trombone – Alan Kaplan, Alex Iles, Bill Reichenbach, Steve Holtman
 Trumpet – Dan Fornero, Dan Rosenboom, Harry Kim, Jon Lewis, Rob Schaer
 Tuba – Doug Tornquist, Gary Hickman
 Viola – Aaron Oltman, Alma Fernandez, Andrew Duckles, Brian Dembow, Caroline Buckman, Darrin McCann, David Walther, Diana Wade, Erik Rynearson, Jonathan Moerschel, Luke Maurer, Matt Funes, Meredith Crawford, Robert Brophy, Shawn Mann
 Violin – Aimee Kreston, Alyssa Park, Amy Hershberger, Andrew Bulbrook, Belinda Broughton, Ben Jacobson, Bruce Dukov, Carol Pool, Charlie Bisharat, Christian Hebel, Daphne Chen, Darius Campo, Grace Oh, Ina Veli, Jackie Brand, Jessica Guideri, Josefina Vergara, Julie Gigante, Julie Rogers, Katia Popov, Kevin Kumar, Lisa Liu, Luanne Homzy, Lucia Micarelli, Maia Jasper, Marisa Sorajja, Marisa Kuney, Natalie Leggett, Neel Hammond, Nina Evtuhov, Paul Cartwright, Paul Henning, Phil Levy, Radu Pieptea, Rafael Rishik, Rebecca Chung Hamilton, Roberto Cani, Roger Wilkie, Sandy Cameron, Sara Parkins, Sarah Thornblade, Serena McKinney, Shalini Vijayan, Songa Lee, Tammy Hatwan, Tereza Stanislav
 Orchestra
 Orchestration – Andrew Kinney, Jon Kull, Pete Anthony, Randy Kerber, Rick Giovinazzo
 Supervising orchestrator – John Ashton Thomas
 Conductor – John Powell
 Contractor – Gina Zimmitti, Whitney Martin
 Recording – Tim Lauber
 Stage engineer – Denis St. Amand
 Stage manager – Damon Tedesco, Peter Nelson
 Management
 Business affairs – Tom Cavanaugh
 Executive in charge of music – Danielle Diego
 Music clearance – Ellen Ginsburg
 Soundtrack co-ordination – JoAnn Orgel
 Executive producer – Matt Verboys
 Music production supervisor – Rebecca Morellato
 Music supervisor  – Johnny Choi, Patrick Houlihan

References 

John Powell (film composer) soundtracks
2017 soundtrack albums
La-La Land Records soundtracks
Island Records soundtracks
Pop soundtracks
Latin pop soundtracks